Semenkovo is a rural locality (a village) in Mayskoye Rural Settlement, Vologodsky District, Vologda Oblast, Russia. The population was 4 as of 2002.

Geography 
Semenkovo is located 22 km northwest of Vologda (the district's administrative centre) by road. Zarya, Kovylevo is the nearest locality. creek Mesha

References 

Rural localities in Vologodsky District

  
    the road was made with the personal money of residents in Kovylevo and Semenkovo. initiator Andrey Kochurov